is a Japanese actor who is affiliated with Toki Entertainment. He played the role of Ryuji Iwasaki (Blue Buster) in the 2012 Super Sentai TV series Tokumei Sentai Go-Busters. His blood type is B.

Biography
Baba was a scout in office officials at the local entertainment industry.

In April 2008, his full-fledged debut was in the television drama Tokyo Ghost Trip. From the same year, Baba made five appearances as Kunimitsu Tezuka in Tenimyu. Later on, he was active in theater and films.

In 2011, his first main role was in the film Crazy-ism. The film was officially exhibited in the 35th Montreal World Film Festival "Focus on World Cinema Department".

In 2012, Baba appeared in Tokumei Sentai Go-Busters as Ryuji Iwasaki/Blue Buster.

His hobbies are watching films and he is good at cooking.

Filmography

TV series

Films

References

External links
 Toki Entertainment profile 
 Official blog (inactive) 
 Toki Entertainment channel
 
 

Japanese male film actors
Japanese male television actors
1984 births
Living people
Actors from Chiba Prefecture
21st-century Japanese male actors